The 1998 CAF Champions League Final is the final of the 1998 CAF Champions League, the 34th edition of Africa's premier club football tournament organized by the Confederation of African Football (CAF), and the 2nd edition under the current CAF Champions League format.

The final is contested in two-legged home-and-away format between Dynamos FC of Zimbabwe and ASEC Mimosas of Côte d'Ivoire. The first leg was hosted by Dynamos FC at the National Sports Stadium in Harare on 28 November 1998, while the second leg was hosted by ASEC Mimosas at the Stade Félix Houphouët-Boigny in Abidjan on 12 December 1998. ASEC Mimosas won on aggregate and it earns the right to play in the 1999 CAF Super Cup against the winner of the 1998 African Cup Winners' Cup.

Qualified teams
In the following table, finals until 1996 were in the African Cup of Champions Club era, since 1997 were in the CAF Champions League era.

Venues

Harare National Stadium

Harare National Stadium is a multi-purpose stadium, in Harare, Zimbabwe, with a maximum capacity of 60,000 people. It is the largest stadium in Zimbabwe. Located in Harare just a Few meters from Heroes Acre. It is used mostly for football matches, but is also used for rugby union. CAPS United F.C. use the venue, which opened in 1987, for most of their home games.

The stadium has hosted many important events since its construction such as the 1995 All-Africa Games.

Although it is not the stadium of Dynamos, it was used in the CAF Champions League because it is larger than Rufaro Stadium (stadium of the team) that has a capacity of 35,000 spectators.

Stade Félix Houphouët-Boigny

Félix Houphouët-Boigny Stadium, nicknamed Le Félicia, is a multi-purpose stadium, which can host football, rugby union and athletics, in Abidjan, Ivory Coast. It is the national stadium of the Ivory Coast national football team. It is named after the first president of the country, Félix Houphouët-Boigny, and is located in the commune of Le Plateau. The stadium has a capacity of 50,000. It also hosts matches of the ASEC Abidjan. It has been the site of several deadly stampedes.

Road to final

Format
The final was decided over two legs, with aggregate goals used to determine the winner. If the sides were level on aggregate after the second leg, the away goals rule would have been applied, and if still level, the tie would have proceeded directly to a penalty shootout (no extra time is played).

Matches

First leg

Second leg

References

External links
Champions' League 1998 - Rec.Sport.Soccer Statistics Foundation

1998
Final
ASEC Mimosas matches
Dynamos F.C. matches